Brian Hersholt Ellerbe (born September 1, 1963) is an American basketball coach.  The Seat Pleasant, Maryland native served as head men's basketball coach at Loyola College in Maryland—now known as Loyola University Maryland—from 1994 to 1997 and the University of Michigan from 1997 to 2001.

Career
Ellerbe attended Bowie High School in Bowie, Maryland.  He was a four-year starter at Rutgers University from 1981 to 1985. Ellerbe played in the backcourt at Rutgers with John Battle for Tom Young.

Ellerbe served as a graduate assistant at Rutgers in the 1985–86 season, before becoming an assistant coach at Bowling Green for two seasons. In the 1988–89 season, Ellerbe was an assistant coach at George Mason University, then at South Carolina the next season. From 1990 to 1994, Ellerbe was an assistant at Virginia.

Ellerbe became head coach at Loyola University Maryland in 1994. In three seasons, Ellerbe turned the team from 9–18 to 13–14.

From 1997 to 2001, Ellerbe was head coach at the University of Michigan. Ellerbe led Michigan to an appearance in the 1998 NCAA tournament and 2000 NIT. However, all of Ellerbe's wins in his first two seasons at Michigan were later vacated as a result of the University of Michigan basketball scandal in which four players received money from booster Ed Martin.  These infractions dated to the previous coaching staff, and Ellerbe himself was cleared of wrongdoing. Following a 10–18 season, Michigan fired Ellerbe on March 13, 2001.

Ellerbe left coaching to become a consultant for youth and collegiate basketball programs. In 2005, Ellerbe became vice president for corporate development at Madison Grace Construction Services.

In 2009, Ellerbe returned to basketball coaching at George Washington under Karl Hobbs. From 2010 to 2013, Ellerbe was an assistant at DePaul on the staff of Oliver Purnell. In 2015, Ellerbe joined Todd Bozeman's staff at Morgan State.

In 2019, Ellerbe once again left coaching to become the Athletic Director at Archbishop Carroll High School (Washington, D.C.).

Head coaching record

  Due to NCAA sanctions, a total of 36 wins were vacated: 24 wins from the 1997–98 season, including 11 Big Ten regular season wins, three wins in the Big Ten tournament, and one win in the NCAA Tournament, and 12 wins in the 1998–99 season (including five Big Ten regular season wins). Michigan's 1998 Big Ten tournament championship was also vacated. Originally, Michigan finished fourth in the Big Ten in 1997–98 and ninth in 1998–99.

References

1963 births
Living people
African-American basketball coaches
American men's basketball players
Basketball coaches from Maryland
Basketball players from Maryland
College men's basketball head coaches in the United States
DePaul Blue Demons men's basketball coaches
George Mason Patriots men's basketball coaches
George Washington Colonials men's basketball coaches
Guards (basketball)
Loyola Greyhounds men's basketball coaches
Michigan Wolverines men's basketball coaches
Morgan State Bears men's basketball coaches
People from Bowie, Maryland
People from Seat Pleasant, Maryland
Rutgers Scarlet Knights men's basketball coaches
Rutgers Scarlet Knights men's basketball players
South Carolina Gamecocks men's basketball coaches
Sportspeople from the Washington metropolitan area
Virginia Cavaliers men's basketball coaches